Javar Rural District is a rural district (dehestan) in the Central District of Kuhbanan County, Kerman Province, Iran. At the 2006 census, its population was 2,783, in 774 families. The rural district has 44 villages.

References 

Rural Districts of Kerman Province
Kuhbanan County